The Lanzo Valleys (in Italian Valli di Lanzo, in Piedmontese Valade ëd Lans) is a group of valleys in the north-west of Piedmont in the Metropolitan City of Turin, Italy.

Etymology
The valleys take their name from the city of Lanzo, which lies in the main valley near its exit on the Po Plain.

Geography 

The Stura di Lanzo, a tributary of the Po, collects the waters flowing through the valleys.
The most important sub-valleys are, from south to north and from west to east, Valle di Viù (literally Valley of Viù), 'Val d'Ala (literally Valley of Ala), Val Grande  (literally Great Valley) and Val Tesso  (literally Valley of Tesso, being the Tesso a left-hand tributary of Stura di Lanzo).

Besides Lanzo other municipalities of the area are Germagnano, Traves, Monastero di Lanzo,  Coassolo Torinese, Pessinetto, Ceres, Ala di Stura, Balme, Viù, Lemie, Usseglio, Cantoira, Chialamberto and Groscavallo.

Access 
The valleys can be reached by the Po Plain either by railway, with the Ferrovia Torino-Ceres, or by road, following the strada provinciale n.1 named "Direttisima delle Valli di Lanzo".

Notable summits

Among the notable summits which surround the valley there are:

 Uia di Ciamarella - 3,676 m 
 Levanna - 3,619 m 
 Uia di Bessanese - 3,606 m
 Croce Rossa - 3,566 m
 Punta d'Arnas - 3,560 m
 Rocciamelone - 3,538 m 
 Punta Sulè - 3,384 m
 Uia di Mondrone - 2,964 m
 Punta Lunella - 2,272 m
 Monte Civrari - 2,302 m
 Monte Colombano - 1,658 m.

Notes and references

External links

 http://www.comunitamontanavlcc.it/ 

Valleys of Piedmont
Valleys of the Alps
Metropolitan City of Turin
Geographical, historical and cultural regions of Piedmont